Adelsdorf is a municipality in the district of Erlangen-Höchstadt, in Bavaria, Germany.

Coat of arms
The key refers to the Lords of Schlüsselberg who were prominent in the area before they died out in the Middle Ages.  The beaver refers to the Bibra family which had the castle of Adelsdorf from 1687 until 1993.

Twin towns – sister cities
Adelsdorf is twinned with:

  Uggiate-Trevano, Italy (1997)
  Feldbach, Styria, Austria (2007)

References

External links
 Coat of Arms History

Erlangen-Höchstadt
Bibra family